St. Joseph's Rockware of Worksop Women Football Club is an English women's football club based in Worksop, Nottinghamshire. The club currently play in the Rockware Glass Sports and Social Club.

The club was formed as Worksop Town Ladies in 2015, but changed their name in 2020.

History

Season by season record

References

Women's football clubs in England
Sheffield & Hallamshire County FA members